Kjartan Poskitt (born 15 May 1956 in York) is a British writer and TV presenter who is best known for writing the Murderous Maths children's series of books.

Early life and education 
Poskitt was born in York, England, grew up in Selby, Yorkshire and was educated at the Selby Abbey School, at Terrington Hall, North Yorkshire, and at Bootham School, York, before studying engineering at Collingwood College, Durham University.

Career 
Poskitt was a member of a comedy group while at Durham University, and toured with it to the US in 1979, playing the piano and singing, performing skits and doing a ventriloquist act with a dummy which wouldn't speak. He participated in the National Student Drama Festival from 1976-1980, and also performed solo at the Edinburgh Fringe Festival from 1979 to 1981. He was a member of the pop group Candlewick Green in the early 1980s.

He has written and directed a number of pantomimes performed by the National Student Theatre Company, including Jack and the Beanstalk (1979), The Sleeping Beauty (1980), Cinderella (1981), Jack and the Beanstalk (1983), as well as a nativity play, The Road to Bethlehem (1980), and a "musical ghost pantomime", Sammy's Magic Garden (1985).

Early children's television appearances included Swap Shop during its Edinburgh Festival broadcasts, and ITV Yorkshire's Behind the Bike Sheds.

Writing 
In addition to his  science and maths books, which include books on Isaac Newton (Dead Famous: Isaac Newton and his Apple), and various galaxy puzzles, practical jokes and secret codes, Poskitt has written a book of magical tricks (Magic Tricks with Underpants, Scholastic 2004), a GCSE Maths support book and four Rosie and Jim annuals. In 2007, Poskitt published the first in a series of children's novels called Urgum the Axeman. Since then he has written the "Borgon the Axeboy" series and the award winning "Agatha Parrot" series.

He also wrote the theme tune for the children's art program SMart, as well as the title theme and music for the first two series of Brum. He is also the creator of a logic puzzle, Kjarposko.

He has been a presenter for a number of (mostly BBC) educational children's TV shows.

See also

 List of children's non-fiction writers
 Murderous Maths

References

External links
 Official website
 Murderous Maths official website
 Interview with Poskitt on Scholastic website

British children's writers
British non-fiction writers
Living people
People from Aylesbury
1956 births
English people of Hungarian descent
British male writers
Alumni of Collingwood College, Durham
Male non-fiction writers